Nuestra Visión (translation: Our Vision) is an American Spanish language free-to-air television network, owned by Publicidad y Contenido Editorial S.A. de C.V. a subsidiary of América Móvil. The network launched on November 21, 2017 and is available in select markets across the United States.

The network primarily features Mexican movies from the golden era of Mexican movies to recent productions. Programming also includes live sporting events as well as special events, such as concerts, interviews with top-tier celebrities, series and music clips. It also airs daily newscasts and sportscasts produced live through companies owned by América Móvil, UNO TV and Claro Sports.

History
The plans to launch Nuestra Visión were first revealed on January 17, 2017 by Mexican billionaire Carlos Slim's telecommunications corporation, America Movil. The network's strategy was to specifically target the millions of Mexican Americans living in the United States, as revealed by CEO Víctor Herrera in a statement. The network launched on November 21, 2017, with only five affiliated stations

By 2019 it more than doubled its coverage and is available in over 4.2 million homes. In order to make the network available to everyone in the United States, the network launched an app on September 16, 2019, coinciding with Mexican Independence Day.

In August 2020, the network was added to the line-up of the Pluto TV streaming service. As of the summer of 2022, it became part of the ViX lineup.

Programming
Nuestra Visión's programming consists of Mexican movie libraries, composed of over 2,300 movie titles, spanning from the Golden Age of Mexican cinema to recent productions. Nuestra Vision also features sports programming, including live games from Ascenso MX and Liga MX Femenil, as well as American football, boxing, CMLL wrestling, baseball, and mixed martial arts. The network also features sports news and content, and news produced live from Mexico by Claro Sports and UNO TV respectively. Nuestra Visión also features shows and interviews with top-tier Mexican and International talent and celebrities. Additionally, the network offers productions from Claro that target different types of audiences, ranging from young Latin adults to seniors, with content rating from TV-G to TV-MA.

Current programming

Talk/lifestyle/reality shows
Aprende:
Dress Code
El Libro Rojo
La Caja de Pandora
Noctámbulos, Historias De Una Noche
Palabra de Cine

News programming 
 Marca Claro Radio en Vivo
 Noticias en Vivo Gabriela Calzada
 Noticias en Vivo José Cárdenas

Scripted programming 
El Torito 
¡Yo Soy Yo!: Dar El Primer Paso

Music programming 
Domingo estelar

Children programming
Cantinflas show

Sports programming
Sports talk
 Deportes en Claro
 Deportes en Claro Matutino
 Game Plan LFA
 Jugando Claro en Vivo
 Vidas extraordinarias

Sporting events
Ascenso MX
Liga MX Femenil
Liga de Fútbol Americano Profesional
Consejo Mundial de Lucha Libre
Nuestro Box

Affiliates
Nuestra Visión is available over the air. At launch on November 21, 2017, it had just five affiliate stations, it now has eleven. As of September 2019, it is available in 4.2 million homes across the United States.

List of affiliates

References

External links

América Móvil
Spanish-language television networks in the United States
Television channels and stations established in 2017